Michael Judge (born 12th June 1975 in Dublin) is a professional snooker player from the Republic of Ireland. His best performance in a ranking event came in the 2004 Grand Prix, where he reached the semi-finals, and he reached his highest ranking, 24th, for the 2002–03 season. He returned to the professional tour having gained a two-year card at 2021 Q School.

Career
Judge qualified for the World Championship three times, his best performance coming in the 2001 tournament, after knocking  Jimmy White out in qualifying and John Parrott in the first round, before being knocked out by fellow Dubliner Ken Doherty. He lost to eventual champion Peter Ebdon in the first round a year later. He has lost in the final qualifying round on seven occasions, a record.

In 2006–07 he had something of a return to form, climbing 10 places in the rankings to 34th, after five successive falls from his career high of 24th, aided by a last 16 run in the Welsh Open. He then reached the last 16 of the Grand Prix early in the 2007–08 season, and repeated this at the Welsh Open in Newport, by beating Nigel Bond and Graeme Dott, both 5–4, before succumbing to a 5–2 defeat by Stephen Lee. He did enough in the rest of the season to return to the top 32 of the rankings. However, he slipped straight back out the following season after two last sixteen runs were tempered by six first round defeats. In January 2010 he qualified for the Welsh Open, losing to John Higgins in the first round proper. He quit after the following season but returned to the sport a year later and would go on to win the Irish Amateur Championship in 2013 beating Robert Redmond 8–5 in the final. He won it again in 2018 and entered Q School in a bid to win back his place on the professional snooker tour. In the first round of event one he defeated former pro Mitchell Mann 4–3. In the second event he hit a century against Hu Hao. He went into the final day still in contention.

Performance and rankings timeline

Career finals

Non-ranking finals: 4 (2 titles)

Amateur finals: 5 (2 titles)

References

External links

Player Profile at Pro Snooker

1975 births
Living people
Irish snooker players
Sportspeople from Dublin (city)